Efren or Efrén is a given name. Notable people with the name include:

Efrén Echeverría (born 1932), musician guitarist, composer, and compiler from Paraguay
Efrén Pérez Rivera (born 1929), former college professor and noted Puerto Rican environmentalist leader
Efrén Rebolledo (1877–1929), Mexican poet and diplomat
Efrén Vázquez (born 1986), Spanish Grand Prix motorcycle road racer in the 250 cc World Championship riding a Derbi
Efren de la Cruz (born 1989), Ecuadorian footballer who plays for LDU Quito
Efren Herrera (born 1951), former American football place-kicker and wide receiver in the National Football League
Efren Peñaflorida (born 1981), teacher and social worker in the Philippines
Efren Ramirez (born 1973), American actor
Efren Reyes (born 1954), Filipino professional pool player from Angeles City and a two-time world champion
Efren Reyes Jr. (born 1962), Filipino actor
Efren Saldivar (born 1969), American serial killer who murdered patients while working as a respiratory therapist
Efren Torres (born 1943), former a Mexican boxer, who was world champion in the Flyweight division

See also
Sa Paraiso ni Efren (English: Efren's Paradise), a film that tackles interwoven four-way emotional entanglements